Koen Smet (born 9 August 1992) is a Dutch athlete specialising in the sprint hurdles. He won a silver medal at the 2013 European  U23 Championships. In addition, he represented his country at two World Indoor Championships reaching the semifinals in 2018.

His personal bests are 13.53 seconds in the 110 metres hurdles (+0.7 m/s, Oordegem 2018) and 7.65 seconds in the 60 metres hurdles (Magglingen 2018).

International competitions

1Did not start in the final

References

1992 births
Living people
Dutch male hurdlers
Athletes from Amsterdam